A meeting place is a location where some form of gathering may occur.

Meeting Place or The Meeting Place may also refer to:

Buildings and structures
The Meeting Place (church) in Winnipeg, Manitoba
The Meeting Place (sculpture) in St Pancras railway station, London

Music and Songs
"The Meeting Place" (song), a 1986 song by XTC
"Meeting Place", by The Last Shadow Puppets from the album The Age of the Understatement

See also
Meeting
The Meeting Place Cannot Be Changed, a 1979 Soviet television miniseries
Meeting Point, a liberal political organisation and party in Hong Kong
The Meeting Point, a 1989 Yugoslavian fantasy/comedy-drama film